Exo-Man is a 1977 made-for-TV superhero film directed by Richard Irving. The film's screenplay was written by Henri Simoun and Lionel E. Siegel from a story by Martin Caidin and Henri Simoun. It stars David Ackroyd, Anne Schedeen, A Martinez, and José Ferrer.

According to Unsold TV Pilots written by Lee Goldberg the film was intended as a pilot for a continuing series. Goldberg claims the film was not accepted for series production due to lack of merchandising potential, despite relatively successful viewing numbers.

Plot
A professor, who has been paralyzed in an attack by mob hit men, builds an armored suit that enables him to walk and fight crime.

Cast

David Ackroyd as Dr. Nicholas Conrad / Exo-Man
Anne Schedeen as Emily Frost
A Martinez as Raphael Torres
José Ferrer as Kermit Haas
Jack Colvin as Martin
Harry Morgan as Arthur Travis
Kevin McCarthy as D.A. Kamenski
Donald Moffat as Wallace Rogers

Reception

The show has gained a negative criticism since it aired from Io9 and Topless Robot. The latter writes, "A series that was bold in its vision of screwing Stan Lee out of a check, Exo Man is an Iron Man clone of the highest order."

References

External links
 

1970s superhero films
1977 television films
1977 films
American television films
1970s English-language films
American superhero films
Television pilots not picked up as a series
1970s American films